Donal Henahan (February 28, 1921 – August 19, 2012) was an American music critic and journalist who had lengthy associations with the Chicago Daily News and The New York Times. With the Times he won the annual Pulitzer Prize for Criticism in 1986; he had been a finalist in 1982.

Life and career
Born in Cleveland, Ohio, Henahan initially studied at Kent State University and Ohio University, but his education was interrupted by military service during World War II. As a fighter pilot in the United States Army Air Forces
from 1942 to 1945, he attained the rank of first lieutenant and was awarded the Air Medal with four oak leaf clusters. After the war, he entered Northwestern University, where he received his undergraduate degree in 1948. In 1949, he entered the University of Chicago to pursue graduate studies, and from 1951 to 1958 he studied piano, singing, and classical guitar at the Chicago School of Music at Roosevelt University. He later pursued graduate studies in music at Columbia University and Yale University, ultimately earning a master's degree from the latter institution.

While a student at Northwestern, Henahan joined the news staff of the Chicago Daily News in 1947. He remained with that paper for the next two decades, notably becoming chief music critic of the Daily News in 1957. He concurrently contributed articles as a freelance writer to numerous periodicals, including Esquire, Harper's Bazaar, High Fidelity, Musical Quarterly, Saturday Review, Stereo Review and The Saturday Evening Post.

In 1967, Henahan left the Chicago Daily News to join the music criticism staff at The New York Times. He became chief music critic of The Times in 1980 and was awarded the Pulitzer Prize for Criticism in 1986. He remained chief music critic at The Times until his retirement in 1991 when he was succeeded by critic Edward Rothstein. After his retirement, he periodically contributed articles to The Times through 1997 as a freelance writer.

Henahan died, aged 91, on August 19, 2012 at his Manhattan home.

References

Citations

1921 births
2012 deaths
American male journalists
American music critics
Classical music critics
Columbia University School of the Arts alumni
Kent State University alumni
Northwestern University alumni
Ohio University alumni
Pulitzer Prize for Criticism winners
Critics employed by The New York Times
The New York Times Pulitzer Prize winners
Roosevelt University alumni
University of Chicago alumni
Yale School of Music alumni
Recipients of the Air Medal
Writers from Cleveland
United States Army Air Forces pilots of World War II